Orgelbau Mebold is a company building pipe organs in Siegen, Germany. It was founded in 1967 by Hans Peter Mebold (27 April 1942 – 21 July 2001), and has been run since 2018 by his son Mathias Mebold (born 1978). The company builds new organs, restores historic instruments, and specializes in portable small instruments (Truhenorgel).

Founding 
Hans Peter Mebold was born in Weidenau. He founded the company Orgelbau Mebold in Frauenberg near Marburg in 1976. In 1979, they moved to Siegen, to the village Breitenbach. Hans Peter Mebold died in 2001.

Continuation 
After Mebold's death, Johannes Tobias Späth took over, together with Marianne Mebold, the founder's widow. From 1982, he was responsible for the workshop.

, the owner is Mathias Mebold, a son of Hans Peter Mebold, born in 1978.

Organs and concerts 
The company builds new organs, mostly for use in parish churches, but also in parish halls and hospitals. A typical layout combines a Great division in Baroque style with a Swell division with timbres of the Romantic period, which makes it possible to play a wide range of organ repertory. The company restores historic instruments. It has specialized in building small organs called Truhenorgel, which serve for accompanying choirs in church and for rehearsal.

Mebold organs have attracted notable organists to play concerts. Dan Zerfaß, organist of the Worms Cathedral, played the first concert at the organ in St. Martin, Idstein, in 2006, followed by concerts of Kalevi Kiviniemi, and the duo Giora Feidman and Matthias Eisenberg, among others. Anton Guggemos, the organist of the Wieskirche, played in St. Bardo in Petterweil, part of Karben.

Works 
Among the organ builders' new instruments are:

References

External links 
 
 
 Fronhausen (Lahn), Heilig-Kreuz-Kirche organindex.de
 Katholische Pfarrkirche St. Bardo organindex.de
 Kath. Kirche St. Elisabeth organindex.de
 Wetzlar/Dalheim, Evangelisches Gemeindezentrum organindex.de
 Röm.-kath. Pfarrkirche zum hl. Joseph organindex.de
 Die Mebold-Orgel (Krypta) St. Michael, Siegen
 Die Truhenorgel Nikolaikirche, Siegen

German pipe organ builders
1942 births
2001 deaths
Musical instrument manufacturing companies of Germany
Companies based in North Rhine-Westphalia